Richard Druckenbrod (May 29, 1929 — October 27, 2003) was a 20th century Pennsylvania German language teacher, historian, pastor, and writer. 

Born in Reading, Pennsylvania, he graduated from Franklin and Marshall College. In 1951, he was awarded a Fulbright Scholarship for study at the University of Graz in Austria. Returning from Austria, he studied at Lancaster Theological Seminary and was ordained in the United Church of Christ in 1954. 

Druckenbrod was president of the Pennsylvania German Society from 1980 to 1992, and the author of the column "Es Deitsch Schtick" in The Morning Call newspaper from February 13, 1978 to July 29, 1985. Druckenbrod was a frequent preacher at church services in the Pennsylvania German dialect and a speaker at Fersommling gatherings. His dialect pseudonym was Pit Schweffelbrenner.

He also worked as a professor of theology at Cedar Crest College in Allentown, Pennsylvania and as a professor in the Chemistry Department at Franklin & Marshall College in Lancaster, Pennsylvania.

Bibliography
Mir Schwetz Deitsch: A Guide for Learning the Skills of Reading, Writing and Speaking Pennsylvania German (1977)
Mir Lanne Deitsch: A Guide for Learning the Skills of Reading, Writing and Speaking Pennsylvania German (1981, 1997)
Earl C. Haag, A Pennsylvania German Anthology (1988)

References

"Druckenbrod F&M Scholarship Winner," Lancaster Intelligencer Journal, May 17, 1951, p. 2.
Obituary, The Morning Call, October 30, 2003

External links
Grave at Fairview Cemetery in Allentown, Pennsylvania

1929 births
1950 deaths
Poets from Pennsylvania
German-American history
Pennsylvania Dutch people
People from Reading, Pennsylvania
Educators from Allentown, Pennsylvania
Writers from Allentown, Pennsylvania
United Church of Christ ministers
United Church of Christ in Pennsylvania
Franklin & Marshall College alumni
University of Graz alumni
American writers in Pennsylvania Dutch
Pennsylvania Dutch culture
German language in the United States
Journalists from Pennsylvania
Linguists from the United States